Suddenly is the third studio album by Australian rock and pop band The Sports, released in March 1980. The album peaked at number 13 on the Australian Kent Music Report.

Reception

Steve Schnee from AllMusic said "Although they are fully formed three-minute slices of Aussie pop/rock, the melodies aren't as immediate and engaging as before. There are moments that are equal to the previous album, including "Strangers on a Train," "Never Catch Her," "Oh Mama No," and the title track, but those high points don't occur quite as often, adding "through it all, Stephen Cummings' 'angry young man' vocals are energetic and spirited and the band is tight and inspiring."

Luis Feliu from The Canberra Times, opined that it showed "trimmed up reggae-favoured tunes and souped-up straight, melodic rockers... [and] has its fair share of goodies" while he "had reservations about the overall slickness, and excesses in production for the sake of commercial acceptance" by Solley.

Ian McFarlane noticed that it "featured an even slicker, more commercial pop sound."

Track listing

Personnel
The Sports
 Steve Cummings - vocals
 Martin Armiger - guitar, backing vocals
 Andrew Pendlebury - guitar, backing vocals
 Jim Niven - keyboards, backing vocals 
 Robert Glover - bass
 Paul Hitchins - drums
with:
 Herbie Flowers - string bass on "The Lost and the Lonely"
 The Chanter Sisters - backing vocals on "Blue Hearts" and "Perhaps"

Charts

References

The Sports albums
Mushroom Records albums
1980 albums